Latimer station could refer to:

 Latimer station (PAAC), a light rail station in Pittsburgh, Pennsylvania
 Latimer Road tube station, a London Underground station
 Chalfont & Latimer tube station, a London Underground station